Visitors to the Central African Republic must obtain a visa from one of the Central African Republic diplomatic missions or French diplomatic missions unless they come from one of the visa exempt countries.

Visa policy map

Visa exemption 
Citizens of the following 16 countries can visit Central African Republic without a visa for up to 90 days (unless otherwise stated):

ID: may enter CAR using valid ID card.

(For now) According to UAE authorities, it is stated that  citizens can enter the country with a Visa on arrival (90 days).

Transit 

Passengers with a confirmed onward ticket for a flight on the same aircraft to a third country. They must stay in the aircraft or in the international transit area of the airport and have documents required for the next destination.

See also

Visa requirements for Central African Republic citizens
Central African Republic passport

References 

Central African Republic
Foreign relations of the Central African Republic